Banner Township is one of fifteen townships in Effingham County, Illinois, USA.  As of the 2010 census, its population was 456 and it contained 199 housing units.

Geography

Cities, towns, villages
 Shumway

Cemeteries
The township contains these four cemeteries: Rentfrow, Saint Marys, Shumway and Trinity Lutheran.

Major highways
  Illinois Route 32
  Illinois Route 33

Demographics

School districts
 Beecher City Community Unit School District 20
 Effingham Community Unit School District 40
 Stewardson-Strasburg Community Unit District 5a
 Teutopolis Community Unit School District 50

Political districts
 Illinois' 19th congressional district
 State House District 109
 State Senate District 55

References
 
 United States Census Bureau 2007 TIGER/Line Shapefiles
 United States National Atlas

External links
 City-Data.com
 Illinois State Archives

Townships in Effingham County, Illinois
Townships in Illinois